Secret is a 2009 South Korean thriller film directed by Yoon Jae-goo.

Synopsis
Kim Seong-yeol is a young Detective in Homicide with the Seoul police. A year earlier, he'd had an affair with his colleague's wife and, slightly drunk on his way back from meeting her, had caused his daughter's death in a car accident. Wracked with guilt but unable to explain what had happened on that day, he is no longer on speaking terms with his wife, Ji-yeon, who obviously blames him for their only child's death. One day, Ji-yeon goes out all dressed up but comes home unexpectedly disheveled and with blood spatters on her blouse but refusing to explain herself. Seong-yeol is called out to investigate the murder of a man with gang connections and is horrified to find trace evidence that hints at his wife's presence at the scene. He assumes that his wife is connected to the murder, and does all he can to keep her from being identified as a suspect. When a mystery man contacts him, claiming to know Ji-yeon is involved and asking for money, the situation is made worse by Ji-yeon refusing to tell him anything at all.

Cast 
 Cha Seung-won as Detective Kim Seong-Yeol
 Song Yoon-ah as Yoo Ji-Yeon
 Ryu Seung-ryong as Cho Gwang-Cheol, called Jae-kal ("Jackal")
 Park Won-sang as Detective Choi
 Oh Jung-se as Kyung-Ho
 Kim In-kwon as Seok-Joon
 Lee El as Young-Sook
 Ye Soo-jung as Ji-yeon's mother
 Ham Sung-min as Boy

Awards
2010 18th Chunsa Film Art Awards: Best Screenplay (Yoon Jae-goo)

References

External links 
https://web.archive.org/web/20110831211954/http://www.secret2009.co.kr/

2009 films
2009 crime thriller films
South Korean crime thriller films
2000s Korean-language films
Films set in Seoul
2000s South Korean films